Høgbrothøgdi or Høgbrothøgde is a mountain in Vang Municipality in Innlandet county, Norway. The mountain is surrounded by several other notable mountains including Snøholstinden to the northeast, Mjølkedalstinden to the north, Storegut and Langeskavltinden to the northwest, and Langeskavlen to the southwest.

See also
List of mountains of Norway by height

References

Vang, Innlandet
Mountains of Innlandet